The 1981 America East men's basketball tournament was hosted by the higher seeds in head-to-head matchups. Canisius, New Hampshire, Niagara and Rhode Island did not qualify for the 1981 tournament. The final was held at The Cabot Center on the campus of Northeastern University. Northeastern gained its first overall America East Conference Championship and an automatic berth to the NCAA tournament with its win over Holy Cross. Northeastern was given the 11th seed in the West Regional of the NCAA Tournament and won in the first round against Fresno 55–53, but lost in the second round to Utah 94–69. Holy Cross and Rhode Island both gained bids to the NIT and lost within the first two rounds to Syracuse and Purdue respectively.

Bracket and Results

* Game Ended in Overtime
** Game Ended in Triple-Overtime

See also
America East Conference

References

America East Conference men's basketball tournament
1980–81 ECAC North men's basketball season